Bells for the South Side is a double album by American jazz saxophonist Roscoe Mitchell, which was recorded live in 2015 at Museum of Contemporary Art, Chicago in the context of "The Freedom Principle", a 50th-anniversary exhibition devoted to the Association for the Advancement of Creative Musicians, and released on ECM.

Reception

In his review for AllMusic, Thom Jurek states, "Bells for the South Side is indeed massive, but its depth, breadth, and inspired performances border on the profound."

The Down Beat review by Bradley Bambarger says, "Pitched between avant-garde jazz and modernist chamber music, the sound poems of Bells for the South Side challenge the ear, whether they are keening or swirling, spare or textured. But the music also has an undeniable grandeur, the feel almost ritualistic."

The Point of Departure review by Michael Rosenstein states, "This release is a tour de force in Mitchell’s impressive catalog and the result is a tribute to his singular vision and sage choice in collaborators."

Track listing
All compositions by Roscoe Mitchell except where noted.
Disc One:
 "Spatial Aspects of the Sound" – 12:14
 "Panoply" – 7:36 
 "Prelude to a Rose" – 12:44
 "Dancing in the Canyon" (Roscoe Mitchell, Craig Taborn, Kikanju Baku) – 10:23
 "EP 7849" – 8:13
 "Bells for the South Side" – 12:26
Disc Two:
 "Prelude to the Card Game, Cards for Drums, and the Final Hand" – 16:03
 "The Last Chord" – 12:26
 "Six Gongs and Two Woodblocks" – 7:50 
 "R509A Twenty B" – 1:34
 "Red Moon in the Sky / Odwalla" – 25:49

Personnel
Roscoe Mitchell - sopranino sax, soprano sax, alto sax, bass sax, flute, piccolo, bass recorder, percussion
James Fei – sopranino sax, alto sax, contra-alto clarinet, electronics
Hugh Ragin – trumpet, piccolo trumpet
Tyshawn Sorey – trombone, piano, drums, percussion
Craig Taborn – piano, organ, electronics
Jaribu Shahid – double bass, bass guitar, percussion
William Winant – percussion, tubular bells, glockenspiel, vibraphone, marimba, roto toms, cymbals, bass drum, woodblocks, timpani
Kikanju Baku – drums, percussion
Tani Tabbal – drums, percussion

References

External links
 A Pioneering Black Composer Keeps Pushing, by Seth Colter Walls at New York Times

2017 live albums
Roscoe Mitchell live albums
ECM Records live albums